Beryozovka is a rural locality (a selo) and the administrative center of Beryozovskoye Rural Settlement, Anninsky District, Voronezh Oblast, Russia. The population was 936 as of 2010. There are 15 streets.

Geography 
Beryozovka is located 30 km southwest of Anna (the district's administrative centre) by road. Chesmenka is the nearest rural locality.

References 

Rural localities in Anninsky District